Joe Bergin may refer to:

 Joe Bergin (Gaelic footballer) (born 1981), Gaelic footballer from County Galway, Ireland
 Joe Bergin (hurler) (born 1988), Irish sportsperson from County Offaly